The Headquarters Sessions is an 84-track three-CD set by the Monkees containing 60 previously unreleased recordings from the sessions that produced the band's third album, Headquarters.

It includes recordings from sessions where the band exercised creative control over all aspects of the recording process and where they played most of the instruments. All vocal masters from the sessions that were not included on the original stereo album are included, as well as the surviving vocal demos and a few tracks with vocals which were never completed. In addition, the original mono masters are presented in an initially proposed, but ultimately unused, running order.

The packaging contained a gatefold digipack with a 40-page booklet contained photographs and detailed liner notes written by Andrew Sandoval and Bill Inglot.

The Headquarters Sessions was a limited edition release, with 4,500 copies being made available by Rhino HandMade.

Track listing
CD 1
 "She's So Far Out, She's In" (Tracking Session Takes 1 and 2)
 "The Girl I Knew Somewhere" (First Version) (Tracking Session Composite Takes 1 to 16)
 "The Girl I Knew Somewhere" (First Version) (Master Backing Track Take 22)
 "All of Your Toys" (Rehearsal)
 "All of Your Toys" (Tracking Session Composite Takes 1 to 10)
 "All of Your Toys" (Master Backing Track Take 20 Mono Mix)
 "The Girl I Knew Somewhere" (Second Version) (Tracking Session Composite Featuring Take 15)
 "The Girl I Knew Somewhere" (Second Version) (Tracking Overdub Session Takes 1 and 2)
 "The Girl I Knew Somewhere" (Second Version) (Master Backing Track Take 13A)
 "Seeger's Theme" (Demo)
 "Can You Dig It?" (Demo)
 "Nine Times Blue" (Demo Vocal)
 "Until It's Time for You to Go" (Demo Vocal)
 "She'll Be There" (Demo Vocal)
 "Midnight Train" (Demo Vocal)
 "Sunny Girlfriend" (Acoustic Remix of Master Vocal)
 "Sunny Girlfriend" (Tracking Session Take 7 With Scratch Vocal)
 "Mr. Webster" (Tracking Session Take 28)
 "Band 6" (Stereo Master)
 "Setting Up the Studio for 'Randy Scouse Git'"
 "Randy Scouse Git" (Tracking Session Composite)
 "Randy Scouse Git" (Alternate Version Take 18 Vocal)
 "You Told Me" (Master Backing Track)
 "Monkee Chat" (Studio Dialogue)

CD 2
 "You Told Me" (Take 15 With Rough Lead Vocal)
 "Zilch" (Peter Tork Vocal Track)
 "Zilch" (Davy Jones Vocal Track)
 "Zilch" (Micky Dolenz Vocal Track)
 "Zilch" (Michael Nesmith Vocal Track)
 "I'll Spend My Life With You" (Master Backing Track Take 9)
 "Randy Scouse Git" (Master Backing Track Take 23)
 "Forget That Girl" (Rehearsal)
 "Forget That Girl" (Master Backing Track)
 "Where Has It All Gone?" (First Version) (Tracking Session Take 1)
 "Memphis Tennessee"
 "Twelve-String Improvisation"
 "Where Has It All Gone?" (Second Version) (Master Basic Track Take 12)
 "Jericho"
 "Forget That Girl" (Rough Backing Vocals)
 "Peter Gunn's Gun"
 "I Was Born in East Virginia" (Informal Recording Vocal)
 "Forget That Girl" (Rejected Overdub Session Vocal)
 "Randy Scouse Git" (Alternate Mix With Unused Tag Vocal)
 "Micky in Carlsbad Cavern" (Studio Dialogue)
 "Pillow Time" (Take 1 Vocal)
 "Shades of Gray" (Master Backing Track Take 9B)
 "Masking Tape" (Tracking Session Composite Takes 6 to 8)
 "You Just May Be the One" (Tracking Session Composite)
 "You Just May Be the One" (Master Backing Track)
 "No Time" (First Version) (Tracking Session Composite Takes 3 to 5)
 "Blues" (Excerpt)

CD 3
 "I Can't Get Her Off My Mind" (Master Backing Track)
 "Banjo Jam" (Excerpt)
 "Cripple Creek"
 "Six-String Improvisation"
 "The Story of Rock and Roll" (First Version) (Tracking Session Take 23)
 "Early Morning Blues and Greens" (Master Backing Track)
 "Two-Part Invention in F Major" (Informal Recording)
 "The Story of Rock and Roll" (Second Version) (Tracking Session Take 5A)
 "Don't Be Cruel"
 "For Pete's Sake" (Master Backing Track)
 "No Time" (Second Version) (Tracking Session Composite)
 "No Time" (Second Version) (Master Backing Track Take 7A)
 "Just a Game" (Demo Takes 1 to 3)
 "Fever"
 "Sunny Girlfriend" (Master Backing Track)
 "No Time" (second version) (Master Take 7A With Backing Vocals)
 "All Of Your Toys" (Mono Master)
 "The Girl I Knew Somewhere" (First Version) (Mono Master)
 "For Pete's Sake" (Mono Master)
 "I'll Spend My Life With You" (Mono Master)
 "Forget That Girl" (Mono Master)
 "You Just May Be the One" (Mono Master)
 "Shades of Gray" (Mono Master)
 "Band 6" (Mono Master)
 "Sunny Girlfriend" (Mono Master)
 "Mr. Webster" (Mono Master)
 "You Told Me" (Mono Master)
 "The Girl I Knew Somewhere" (Second Version) (Mono Master)
 "Zilch" (Mono Master)
 "Early Morning Blues and Greens" (Mono Master)
 "Randy Scouse Git" (Mono Master)
 "I Can't Get Her Off My Mind" (Mono Master)
 "No Time" (Mono Master)

References

The Monkees compilation albums
2000 compilation albums
Rhino Handmade compilation albums
Rhino Handmade live albums